Federal elections were held in Mexico on September 1, 1828. In those the positions were elected through indirect election:
 President of the Republic: Head of state and of Government, elected for a period of four years, without possibility of immediate reelection. The elected candidate was Manuel Gómez Pedraza.
 Vice-president of the Republic: Constitutional substitute of the President. The runner-up in the election is elected as vice-president automatically for the same period. The elected candidate was Vicente Guerrero.

Two weeks later Antonio López de Santa Anna rose in rebellion against the election and at the end of November the rebels entered Mexico City. Gómez Pedraza abandoned his position and left the country. The Congress of the Union, pressured by the adherents of Guerrero, decided to cancel the elections and designated Vicente Guerrero as President of the Republic and Anastasio Bustamante as Vice-president from April 1, 1829. This arrangement proved unsustainable and on December 4 Bustamante rebelled against Guerrero, taking the presidency from January 1, 1830. A further rebellion in 1832 led to an agreement by which Gómez Pedraza would return to the presidency, at least until the elections of 1833 which Santa Anna (more interested in the title than the position) would win.

Results

President

Mexico
Legislative elections in Mexico
Presidential elections in Mexico
1828 in Mexico
September 1828 events